The Douglas Diablos were a professional baseball team based in Douglas, Arizona. The team was a member of the Pecos League, an independent baseball league which is not affiliated with Major or Minor League Baseball. They played at Copper King Stadium during the 2014 season and had a 28–36 record. Following the 2014 season in which the team finished in last place, they were immediately dropped by the Pecos League.

References

External links
 Douglas Diablos Homepage

Pecos League teams
Professional baseball teams in Arizona
2014 establishments in Arizona
2014 disestablishments in Arizona
Baseball teams established in 2014
Baseball teams disestablished in 2014
Defunct independent baseball league teams
Douglas, Arizona
Defunct baseball teams in Arizona